Sindh Muslim Government Science College or simply S.M. Government Science College ; ( is a government college located in Karachi, Sindh, Pakistan.

History

It was founded by the founder of Pakistan Muhammad Ali Jinnah on 21 June 1943 for the Muslims of Sindh.

In 2012, it was announced that the college will be merged into the Sindh Madressatul Islam University. Later, it was suspended by the Sindh High Court.

Gallery

References

Universities and colleges in Karachi
Educational institutions established in 1943
Public universities and colleges in Sindh
1943 establishments in India